Star Chamber was an online collectible card game (CCG) first released as just "Star Chamber" in 2003 by Nayantara Studios, later owned by Matrix Games and Worlds Apart Productions, and now owned by Sony Online Entertainment. The game ran on both the Microsoft Windows and Mac OS X platforms. It was free to download and play, with additional cards available for purchase. There was one base set and five expansion sets released for Star Chamber. The game was shut down on March 29, 2012. As compensation, Sony Online Entertainment offered players 3 months of Gold Membership in the online fantasy role-playing games EverQuest and EverQuest II.  These memberships became available on March 16, 2012.

Reception

The original Star Chamber received "favorable" reviews according to the review aggregation website Metacritic.

The staff of Computer Games Magazine presented the game with their 2005 "Best Independent Game" award, and named it the year's ninth-best computer game. They wrote, "The original was released two years ago, and its overhaul only reinforces what its fans already know: This is one of the best-designed computer games of the past five years."

References

External links
 

2003 video games
Card games introduced in 2003
Digital collectible card games
MacOS games
Products and services discontinued in 2012
Turn-based strategy video games
Video games developed in the United States
Windows games
Matrix Games games
Multiplayer and single-player video games
Multiplayer online games
Inactive multiplayer online games